A dual-sport motorcycle is a type of street-legal motorcycle that is designed for both on and off-road use. The terms all-road, on/off road, and dual-purpose are also used for this class of motorcycles. Dual-sports are equipped with street-legal equipment such as lights, speedometer, mirrors, horn, license plate mounting, and muffler and can, therefore, be registered and licensed.

Evolution of dual-sports

The concept of a versatile motorcycle equally at home on dirt and pavement is as old as motorcycling itself.  Most roads were still unpaved when motorized bicycles first appeared around 1900. In a sense, all motorcycles at that time were dual-sports, intended to be used on dirt as well as pavement. Advertisements well into the 1920s depict motorcycles on dirt roads, raising clouds of dust. By 1940, most roads in developed countries were paved and motorcycles had become heavier and more oriented to the street. In the 1950s and 1960s British manufacturers such as Triumph and BSA offered versions of their relatively light street motorcycles with high exhaust pipes, and called them scramblers.
  
Yamaha is credited with rekindling popular interest in dirt worthy motorcycles that could also be ridden on the street. In 1968 they introduced the hugely successful DT-1 based on a 250 cc two-stroke engine. Other manufacturers soon followed with similar models called "enduros". These light weight machines were good on trails and adequate on pavement. Some manufacturers approached the trend from the opposite direction, beginning with a street motorcycle and modifying it for adequate off-road performance. For instance, the Honda CL350 Scrambler was a variation on the Honda CB350 street motorcycle with high exhaust pipes, a larger front wheel, dirt-oriented tires, and lower gearing.

BMW changed the game with the introduction of the R80 G/S in 1980, the first large dual sport machine and the ancestor of the adventure sport category that is so popular today.  Modified versions of the R80 G/S won the gruelling Paris Dakar race four times in five years between 1981-85, and Helge Pedersen rode one for 10 years and 250,000 miles in an around-the-world journey that helped cement the G/S's place in motorcycling history.  

Over the next 20 years, manufacturers began producing heavier and less dirt worthy enduros based on four-stroke engines, as they searched for better combinations of weight, power, durability, performance and comfort. The heavier machines were less popular with “real” dirt riders, who began modifying them to create lighter and more competent trail machines.

Suzuki introduced the DR350 in 1990 and promoted it as a DualSport  or “dirt bike with a license plate”.  The terms "dual-sport" and “dualie” were quickly adopted by riders and the motorcycle press.

Manufacturers use several different names for their dual-sport models.  Suzuki uses DualSport to describe its products. Kawasaki describes its offerings as dual purpose, Honda lists its entry under off-road, and other manufacturers describe machines as enduros, or simply list them as model numbers. A few models are described as "adventure bikes". Despite these differences in terminology, these models can be described as dual-sports, which are street-legal motorcycles that can be operated on pavement, dirt roads and trails. Dual-sport motorcycles are the most practical choice in rural areas in many parts of the world, and when traveling on unpaved trails they can often be a necessity.

Types of dual-sports

Terms such as  dual-sport, enduro and adventure bike are marketing descriptions, not strict definitions of weight, power, and intended usage. Generally a dual sport is less than 400 pounds while bikes above 400 pounds are considered adventure bikes. Accordingly, it is necessary to refer to the manufacturers specifications for a particular model to learn more about its intended use.

There are four ways of creating dual-sports. Some manufacturers add street-legal equipment to existing off-road motorcycles. These bikes are usually light and powerful, at the expense of shorter service life and higher maintenance. This approach is currently taken by European manufacturers such as KTM and Husqvarna. Other manufacturers start with a clean sheet of paper and design a new model designed for a specific combination of dirt and street use. These motorcycles are usually heavier and more durable than the models derived from off-road motorcycles. This approach is currently taken by Aprilia, BMW, Honda, Kawasaki, Moto Guzzi, Suzuki, and Yamaha. Several manufacturers modify street motorcycles to make them more dirt worthy. These bikes are usually more at home on pavement. Finally, owners add street-legal equipment to off-road bikes. In the US, some states license only motorcycles that met highway emissions requirements when first sold, while others allow off-road vehicles to be converted to on-road.

Dual-sports may be grouped by weight and intended purpose. 

They have high fenders and ground clearance plus long travel suspension, and usually come with aggressive dirt oriented tires known as “knobbies”. Lightweights are closest to pure dirt bikes and are most at home on rough trails and two-track roads with occasional forays onto pavement. 
They usually have less suspension travel and ground clearance than lightweights, and often come with tires that offer a compromise between dirt and pavement performance. Middleweights are most at home on smooth trails, graded dirt roads and pavement.
They are designed primarily for riders who want to travel long distances on pavement with occasional forays onto dirt roads. They usually come with smoother tires that perform better on pavement. Motorcycles of this type are increasingly favored by a subset of touring riders who never intend to ride off-pavement, as they tend to offer comfortable riding positions, reasonable range, and the ability to carry luggage, while weighing less and performing more nimbly than a traditional touring bike. These motorcycles are also called adventure or adventure-touring bikes by some manufacturers.

These types are only approximate and new models that split the boundaries and offer different combinations of features appear each year. However, the laws of momentum and inertia always favor lighter dual-sports for tight, rough trails. Heavier dual-sports that emphasize rider comfort, wind protection and the capacity to carry luggage are better choices for long highway trips at higher speeds.

Dual-sports, by definition, are compromises - giving up some dirt performance to be ridden on the street and some street performance to be ridden in the dirt. The merits of a particular model can only be judged relative to the owner’s intended mix of dirt and street riding. Although aficionados may argue the merits of different models, versatile dual-sports can be desirable alternatives to more specialized motorcycles that can only be ridden in one environment.

Accessories
It is common for dual sport owners to customise their bike to match the type of terrain or roads on which they ride. Changing tires, handlebars, seats, bash plates or foot pegs are common modifications. Adding large petrol tanks, racks, luggage and wind screens are common for riders intending to travel far. Dual sport aftermarket parts and accessories are manufactured and available worldwide.

Related motorcycles
When dual-sports are fitted for long-distance travel with accessories such as oversized gas tanks, luggage, and other distance-oriented gear, they are often referred to as "adventure bikes".  These motorcycles offer touring capabilities, but are less comfortable on long pavement trips than full-fledged touring motorcycles such as the Honda Goldwing series.

A supermoto (also known as a supermotard or motard) is typically a converted motocross bike with less suspension travel, smaller front and rear wheels (typically 17" at both ends), road tires and an oversized front brake designed to be primarily run on asphalt. When made street legal, these bikes may also be considered to be a type of dual-sport. In this case, these motorbikes could be seen as somewhere between a sport bike and a dual-sport.

See also
 Outline of motorcycles and motorcycling

References

 
Motorcycle classifications
Dirt biking